Queiros (or Queirós) is a Portuguese surname. It may refer to:

Alberto Queiros (born 1978), French footballer
Antônio de Queirós Teles, Baron of Jundiaí (1789–1870),  Brazilian politician
Carlota Pereira de Queirós (1892–1982), Brazilian feminist and politician
Joel Queirós (born 1982), Portuguese footballer
José Maria de Eça de Queirós (1845–1900), Portuguese novelist, journalist, and diplomat
Pedro Fernandes de Queirós (1565–1614), Portuguese navigator and explorer
Pedro Queirós (born 1984), Portuguese footballer
Renato Queirós (born 1977), Portuguese footballer

See also
Queiroz, São Paulo, Brazilian municipality in the state of São Paulo
Queiroz (surname)

Portuguese-language surnames